Evolution: The World of Sacred Device (known as  in Japan) is a role-playing video game for the Dreamcast and Neo Geo Pocket Color (developed and published by SNK under the name Evolution: Eternal Dungeons, known in Japan as ). It was developed by Sting and published by Entertainment Software Publishing in Japan and Ubi Soft in North America and Europe.

Evolution is a dungeon crawling game that follows the adventures of Mag Launcher. Mag Launcher and his companions use Cyframes, technology discovered in ancient ruins. These Cyframes are sought after by adventurers who explore caverns to find them.

Combat in Evolution is non-random and occurs whenever the character touches an enemy. The battle system uses 3D graphics and is turn-based, with each individual combatant having their own turn.

This game and its sequel, Evolution 2: Far Off Promise were compacted into Evolution Worlds on the GameCube.

Gameplay
This game features multiple different gameplay elements. The battle system within the game not only has "experience points" but it gives "skill points" to characters so they can learn new abilities. In the latter half of the game, there's a lottery system that allows rare items, not found anywhere else in the game, to be obtained. The appraisal system was one of the first alchemy-like interfaces in a game in the 20th century version of Evolution.

Main characters
Mag Launcher - The 17-year-old protagonist of the series. Mag is the last in a family of adventurers, the Launchers. His parents never returned from an adventure, and he has been raised by Gre, his butler, ever since. Mag gets his assignments from the Society, an organization dedicated to studying ruins, and he gets around on his family's seaplane. Mag has a Cyframe shaped like a large hand, called Aeracomet.
Linear Cannon - Mag's partner in exploring ruins. She is 16 years old. She mysteriously appeared on Mag's doorstep one day with a letter from his father, telling Mag to protect her. Linear never speaks, but has learned to play the Ocarina from Mag. In battle she uses a frying pan, her ocarina, and her special healing powers.
Gre Nade - Gre Nade is the Launcher family butler and has raised Mag since his parents disappeared. Gre is 58 years old. He uses a shotgun, martial arts, and his cooking skills in combat.
Pepper Box - An attractive young woman with a cheerful, yet wild and unpredictable personality. She never reveals her age, but is believed to be somewhere in her late twenties. Uses a bazooka Cyframe called Moranna Solnier.
Chain Gun - Mag's female rival. Chain has a Cyframe in the form of jet pack with a large blade attached, called Flamingo, and uses fire-based magic attacks. Chain is 15 years old.
Eugene - Prince of the 8th Imperial Army. He is obsessed with acquiring Linear for himself.

Story
The game begins with two friends, Mag and Linear, on a treasure hunt. When they return home, they receive word that Prince Eugene wishes to talk to them. They go to meet the Prince, who asks them about a device called Evolutia, which Mag's father supposedly found. After learning that they know nothing of it, Eugene dismisses them.

While Mag and Linear search for more treasure, Eugene becomes increasingly interested in Linear. This ultimately leads Eugene to attack Mag's house and kidnap her.

Mag follows Eugene to his battleship, where he is waiting in a giant battlesuit. Eugene voices his belief that Linear is the Evolutia, and that she will give him ultimate power. Mag destroys Eugene's battlesuit, causing the ship to begin breaking apart. Soon, the party gets separated as Mag and Linear flee the ship. When they find a lifeboat, Eugene shoots Mag in the back and nearly kills him. Linear then reveals that she is, indeed, the Evolutia when she revives Mag and sprouts wings so as to carry him away from the battleship. The remaining party members get in their plane and shipwrecked Eugene and his army stare in awe.

Reception

Evolution: The World of Sacred Device received average reviews according to the review aggregation website GameRankings. Jeff Lundrigan of NextGen said, "A case of style with just enough substance to back it up, Evolution is a charmer despite a few unimpressive edges." In Japan, Famitsu gave it a score of 32 out of 40 for Sacred Device, and 27 out of 40 for Eternal Dungeons.

The Enforcer of GamePro said of the game, "While ESP/Sting (the developer) has done a nice job on its first Dreamcast RPG, Evolution is really geared toward younger gamers and won't satisfy the hardcore gamer who's used to epic adventures of Final Fantasy VIII proportions. If you're a fan of the genre, you'll want to check it out – if for no other reason than to salivate over the possibilities of what a kick-ass RPG could be like on the Dreamcast."

Notes

References

External links
 
 

1999 video games
Dreamcast games
Entertainment Software Publishing games
Neo Geo Pocket Color games
Single-player video games
SNK games
Sting Entertainment games
Ubisoft games
Video games developed in Japan
Video games scored by Masaharu Iwata